Tolis is a surname. Notable people with the surname include:
 Ishbara Tolis, ruler of Western Turkic Khaganate
 Sakis Tolis (born 1972), Greek musician
 Themis Tolis (born 1974), Greek musician

Greek-language surnames